Otto Taubmann (8 March 1859 – 4 July 1929) was a German composer and conductor.

Life 
Born in Hamburg, Taubmann was initially a merchant, studied piano, violoncello and composition in Dresden from 1879 to 1882 and made study trips to Paris and Vienna. He worked as a conductor for several years and was the owner of the Freudenberg Conservatory in Wiesbaden from 1886 to 1889. From 1895, he lived in Berlin, first as a theory teacher and music critic (among others for the Berliner Börsen-Courier) and from 1920 to 1925 he was a composition teacher at the Berlin University of the Arts.

Taubmann belonged to the music section of the Prussian Academy of Arts from 1917. His students at the academy included Ludwig Roselius and Walter Draeger among others.

Taubmann's compositional output includes sacred and stage music in addition to Lieder and choral works. In addition to psalm settings and the choral drama Sängerweihe published in 1904 after a libretto by Christian von Ehrenfels, the opera Porzia after Shakespeare's The Merchant of Venice was premiered in 1916. Another opera entitled Die missbrauchten Liebesbriefe remained a fragment.

In addition to his own compositions, Taubmann published a large number of arrangements of pieces by other composers, including Heinrich Schütz, Richard Strauss, Jean Sibelius and Antonín Dvořák. The arrangement of his Romance in C op. 42, written in 1909 and republished in 2007, was called "Excellent" by the otherwise very critical Sibelius in a letter to the publisher.

Occasionally, Taubmann used the pseudonym Nambuat.

Taubmann died in Berlin at the age of 70.

Compositions 
 Streichquartett a-Moll, 1890
 Eine Deutsche Messe for soli, choir, orchestra and organ, 1899
 Sängerweihe, Choral drama, world premiere 25 November 1904 in Elberfeld
 Und ich sah, Lied, op. 26
 Tauwetter, Choral piece
 Kampf und Friede, Cantata
 Porzia, Opera, premiere 15 November 1916 in Frankfurt.
 Sang an die Heimat, Symphony
 Die missbrauchten Liebesbriefe, Opera fragment after Gottfried Keller

Further reading 
 Fabian Kolb: In Die Musik in Geschichte und Gegenwart. Personal part in 17 volumes. Volume 13
 Franz Stieger: Opernlexikon, part II: Komponisten, Tutzing 1977

References

External links 
 
 
 Otto Taubman on Klassika.

German Romantic composers
20th-century German composers
German opera composers
19th-century hymnwriters
20th-century hymnwriters
German composers
German conductors (music)
1859 births
1929 deaths
Musicians from Hamburg